The Blue Elephant 2 (translit. Al Fil Al Azraq 2) is a 2019 Egyptian drama horror mystery crime thriller film directed by Marwan Hamed. The film is a sequel to the 2014 box office hit film The Blue Elephant. Produced under the banner Rotana Film Production and Synergy Films, most of the crew members who were originally part of the prequel were retained. The film stars Karim Abdel Aziz, Khaled El Sawy, Nelly Karim and Shereen Reda in the lead roles. Principal photography of the film commenced in November 2018. The film had its theatrical release on 25 July 2019 and received positive reviews from the critics. Similar to the prequel film, it also became a successful venture at the box office. It also became the highest grossing Egyptian film in the history of Egyptian cinema collecting  at the box office.

Synopsis 
Dr. Yehia (Karim Abdel Aziz) is now married to Lobna (Nelly Karim). A meeting with a new inmate in the psychiatric hospital flips Dr. Yehia's life upside down, she emphasizes the death of his entire family is just only three nights away. Yehia then uses the blue elephant pills in an attempt to control things and solve the puzzles he faces.

Cast 

 Karim Abdel Aziz as Dr. Yehia Rashed
 Khaled El Sawy as Sherif Al Kordy
 Nelly Karim as Lobna
 Hend Sabry as Farida
 Shereen Reda as Deega
 Eyad Nassar as Akram
 Tara Emad as Mermed
 Amgad Elsharqawy as Joy
 Maha Abou Ouf as Mother of Farida

Marketing 
The official trailer of the film was unveiled by the film director on 10 June 2019 and it crossed 15 million views within the 24 hours.

See also 
Cinema of Egypt

References

External links 

 

2019 films
2019 horror films
2010s Arabic-language films
Egyptian drama films
Egyptian mystery films
Egyptian horror films
Films directed by Marwan Hamed
Films based on works by Ahmed Mourad
Films set in Egypt